James H. Stewart (1859–1924) was a teacher and Republican politician.  He was born in Caddo Parish, Louisiana, September 5, 1859 (1857, according to some sources).  He moved to Falls County, Texas, in 1869, and then moved to Hearne, Texas, about 10 years later.  He was educated at Prairie View Normal School, later Prairie View A&M University.  He was elected to the 19th Texas Legislature, representing the 48th District, Robertson County, and served one term.

References
Texas Legislators: Past & Present - James H. Stewart
Personnel of the Texas State Government for 1885, p. 52

Republican Party members of the Texas House of Representatives
1859 births
1924 deaths
African-American politicians during the Reconstruction Era
People from Caddo Parish, Louisiana
People from Falls County, Texas
People from Hearne, Texas
20th-century African-American people